ACT is a German record label founded in 1992 by Siegfried Loch. It is a division of ACT + Music Video founded by Loch and Annette Humpe in 1988. ACT started as a pop music label but folded soon after it started. Loch turned it into a jazz label, at first reissuing music he had recorded for Liberty, Philips, and WEA before turning to new recordings.

ACT's first release was the album Jazzpaña by Vince Mendoza and Arif Mardin and featured Michael Brecker, Al Di Meola, and Steve Khan. It earned two Grammy nominations. ACT was voted Label of the Year in the German Echo Jazz online poll four times in a row from 2010 to 2013.

Roster 
ACT artists include Marius Neset, Bugge Wesseltoft, Lars Danielsson, Viktoria Tolstoy, Vijay Iyer, Leszek Mozdzer, Iiro Rantala, Nils Landgren and Esbjörn Svensson Trio.

Also: Esbjörn Svensson, Rigmor Gustafsson, and Ulf Wakenius. Artists contracted from other countries are the Norwegian saxophonists Geir Lysne, Tore Brunborg, Frøy Aagre, violinist Henning Kraggerud, the band In The Country, the Danish vocalist Cæcilie Norby, the Belgian guitarist Philip Catherine, the Austrian pianist David Helbock, the French drummer Manu Katché. German musicians on the label include Christian Muthspiel, Joachim Kühn, Christof Lauer, Wolfgang Haffner, and Michael Wollny (winner of the ECHO Jazz award in 2010 for best instrumentalist, piano/keyboards).

ACT has recorded Nguyên Lê and Youn Sun Nah (winner of the Echo Jazz award in 2011 for best singer internationally), Jasper van't Hof, Simon Nabatov, and Paolo Fresu.

Discography

References

External links
 Official website

Jazz record labels
German record labels
Record labels established in 1992